The 1976 Kansas City Royals season was their eighth in Major League Baseball. The Royals won their first division title, taking the American League West with a record of 90-72 in the first full season as manager for Whitey Herzog. Kansas City was defeated 3-2 by the New York Yankees in the 1976 American League Championship Series. George Brett (.333) became the first Royals player to win a league batting title.

Offseason 
 September 29, 1975: Harmon Killebrew was released by the Royals.
 November 12, 1975: Nelson Briles was traded by the Royals to the Texas Rangers for Dave Nelson.
 March 3, 1976: Roger Nelson was signed by the Royals as a free agent.

Regular season

Season standings

Record vs. opponents

Opening Day lineup 
 Dave Nelson, DH
 Amos Otis, CF
 George Brett, 3B
 John Mayberry, 1B
 Hal McRae, LF
 Al Cowens, RF
 Fran Healy, C
 Freddie Patek, SS
 Frank White, 2B

Notable transactions 
 June 8, 1976: 1976 Major League Baseball draft
Bill Paschall was drafted by the Royals in the 3rd round.
Ken Phelps was drafted by the Royals in the 15th round.

Roster

Game log

Regular season

|- style="background:#fbb;"
| 1 || April 9 || @ White Sox || 0–4 || Wood (1-0) || Splittorff (0-1) || || Comiskey Park || 40,318 || 0-1 || L1
|- style="background:#bfb;"
| 2 || April 13 || Angels || 7–4 || Fitzmorris (1-0) || Hassler (0-1) || Pattin (1) || Royals Stadium || 25,516 || 1-1 || W1
|- style="background:#fbb;"
| 3 || April 14 || Angels || 6–7 || Monge (1-0) || Pattin (0-1) || Brewer (1) || Royals Stadium || 9,043 || 1-2 || L1
|- style="background:#fbb;"
| 4 || April 15 || Angels || 1–5 || Ryan (1-1) || Splittorff (0-2) || || Royals Stadium || 7,657|| 1-3 || L2
|- style="background:#bfb;"
| 5 || April 16 || Indians || 5–3 || Mingori (1-0) || Peterson (0-1) || Pattin (2) || Royals Stadium || 12,219 || 2-3 || W1
|- style="background:#bfb;"
| 6 || April 17 || Indians || 5–3 (5) || Fitzmorris (2-0) || Eckersley (0-2) || || Royals Stadium || 9,799 || 3-3 || W2
|- style="background:#fbb;"
| 7 || April 18 || Indians || 0–6 || Dobson (1-1) || Busby (0-1) || || Royals Stadium || 10,466 || 3-4 || L1
|- style="background:#fbb;"
| 8 || April 20 || @ Brewers || 4–5 || Broberg (1-0) || Leonard (0-1) || Rodríguez (3) || Milwaukee County Stadium || 4,902 || 3-5 || L2
|- style="background:#bfb;"
| 9 || April 22 || @ Brewers || 2–1 || Bird (1-0) || Colborn (1-1) ||  || Milwaukee County Stadium || 5,196 || 4-5 || W1
|- style="background:#bfb;"
| 10 || April 23 || @ Yankees || 3–2 || Splittorff (1-2) || Hunter (1-3) || Mingori (1) || Yankee Stadium || 35,116 || 5-5 || W2
|- style="background:#fbb;"
| 11 || April 24 || @ Yankees || 8–9 (11) || Lyle (2-0) || Pattin (0-2) || || Yankee Stadium || 16,034 || 5-6 || L1
|- style="background:#fbb;"
| 12 || April 30 || Yankees || 3–5 || Hunter (2-3) || Splittorff (1-3) || || Royals Stadium || 11,368 || 5-7 || L2

|- style="background:#bfb;"
| 13 || May 1 || Yankees || 4–1 || Busby (1-1) || Figueroa (1-1) || || Royals Stadium || 18,703 || 6-7 || W1
|- style="background:#bfb;"
| 14 || May 2 || Yankees || 2–1 (11) || Bird (2-0) || Lyle (1-1) || || Royals Stadium || 13,404 || 7-7 || W2
|- style="background:#bfb;"
| 15 || May 4 || @ Red Sox || 7–5 || Fitzmorris (3-0) || Lee (0-3) || Bird (1) || Fenway Park || 16,274 || 8-7 || W3
|- style="background:#bfb;"
| 16 || May 5 || @ Red Sox || 8–4 || Splittorff (2-3) || Jenkins (1-4) || Littell (1) || Fenway Park || 17,596 || 9-7 || W4
|- style="background:#fbb;"
| 17 || May 7 || @ Orioles || 3–4 || Garland (2-0) || Pattin (0-3) || || Memorial Stadium || 7,310 || 9-8 || L1
|- style="background:#bfb;"
| 18 || May 8 || @ Orioles || 6–3 || Leonard (1-1) || Holtzman (2-2) || Bird (2) || Memorial Stadium || 51,195 || 10-8 || W1
|- style="background:#bfb;"
| 19 || May 9 || @ Orioles || 7–4 || Littell (1-0) || Palmer (4-4) || || Memorial Stadium || 7,590 || 11-8 || W2
|- style="background:#fbb;"
| 20 || May 10 || Twins || 4–5 (10) || Burgmeier (2-0) || Pattin (0-4) || Luebber (2) || Royals Stadium || 12,526 || 11-9 || L1
|- style="background:#bfb;"
| 21 || May 11 || Twins || 6–3 || Bird (3-0) || Luebber (0-1) || Littell (2) || Royals Stadium || 9,652 || 12-9 || W1
|- style="background:#bfb;"
| 22 || May 12 || Twins || 17–5 || Pattin (1-4) || Decker (2-3) || || Royals Stadium || 9,601 || 13-9 || W2
|- style="background:#bfb;"
| 23 || May 13 || White Sox || 13–2 || Leonard (2-1) || B. Johnson (1-4) || || Royals Stadium || 13,657 || 14-9 || W3
|- style="background:#bfb;"
| 24 || May 14 || White Sox || 7–1 || Fitzmorris (4-0) || Vuckovich (0-1) || || Royals Stadium || 12,990 || 15-9 || W4
|- style="background:#bfb;"
| 25 || May 15 || White Sox || 2–1 (12) || Littell (2-0) || Gossage (1-3) || || Royals Stadium || 14,693 || 16-9 || W5
|- style="background:#fbb;"
| 26 || May 16 || White Sox || 3–4 || Carroll (1-1) || Bird (3-1) || Hamilton (1) || Royals Stadium || 28,413 || 16-10 || L1
|- style="background:#bfb;"
| 27 || May 17 || Rangers || 8–7 (12) || Hall (1-0) || Foucault (3-1) || || Royals Stadium || 18,936 || 17-10 || W1
|- style="background:#bfb;"
| 28 || May 18 || Rangers || 3–1 || Fitzmorris (5-0) || Umbarger (3-3) || || Royals Stadium || 14,116 || 18-10 || W2
|- style="background:#bfb;"
| 29 || May 19 || Athletics || 5–2 || Splittorff (3-3) || Torrez (4-4) || Pattin (3) || Royals Stadium || 22,483 || 19-10 || W3
|- style="background:#bfb;"
| 30 || May 20 || Athletics || 8–4 || Bird (4-1) || P. Mitchell (1-2) || Littell (3) || Royals Stadium || 25,682 || 20-10 || W4
|- style="background:#bfb;"
| 31 || May 21 || @ Twins || 5–1 || Leonard (3-1) || Hughes (0-4) || || Metropolitan Stadium || 8,619 || 21-10 || W5
|- style="background:#fbb;"
| 32 || May 22 || @ Twins || 3–5 || Goltz (3-2) || Fitzmorris (5-1) || || Metropolitan Stadium || 6,812 || 21-11 || L1
|- style="background:#fbb;"
| 33 || May 23 || @ Twins || 1–3 || Blyleven (4-3) || Splittorff (3-4) || Campbell (4) || Metropolitan Stadium || 24,716 || 21-12 || L2

|-

|-

|-

|-

|- style="text-align:center;"
| Legend:       = Win       = Loss       = PostponementBold = Royals team member

Postseason Game log

|-

|- style="text-align:center;"
| Legend:       = Win       = Loss       = PostponementBold = Royals team member

Player stats

Batting

Starters by position 
Note: Pos = Position; G = Games played; AB = At bats; H = Hits; Avg. = Batting average; HR = Home runs; RBI = Runs batted in

Other batters 
Note: G = Games played; AB = At bats; H = Hits; Avg. = Batting average; HR = Home runs; RBI = Runs batted in

Pitching

Starting pitchers 
Note: G = Games pitched; IP = Innings pitched; W = Wins; L = Losses; ERA = Earned run average; SO = Strikeouts

Other pitchers 
Note: G = Games pitched; IP = Innings pitched; W = Wins; L = Losses; ERA = Earned run average; SO = Strikeouts

Relief pitchers 
Note: G = Games pitched; W = Wins; L = Losses; SV = Saves; ERA = Earned run average; SO = Strikeouts

ALCS

Game 1 
October 9, 1976, at Royals Stadium

Game 2 
October 10, 1976, at Royals Stadium

Game 3 
October 12, 1976, at Yankee Stadium

Game 4 
October 13, 1976, at Yankee Stadium

Game 5 
October 14, 1976, at Yankee Stadium

Farm system 

LEAGUE CHAMPIONS: Waterloo

Notes

References

External links 
1976 Kansas City Royals at Baseball Reference
1976 Kansas City Royals at Baseball Almanac

Kansas City Royals seasons
Kansas City Royals season
American League West champion seasons
Kansas City